Razmi may refer to:

 Razmi, Iran
 Jahangir Razmi